Paco Sery (born 1 May 1956 in Côte d'Ivoire) is a world music and jazz fusion drummer.  He has played with Joe Zawinul and Eddy Louiss. He also has his own band, releasing his first solo album, Voyages, in 2000.

Discography

With Sixun
2008 Palabre
2006 Live à la Cigale
1998 Nouvelle Vague
1995 Flasback (compilation)
1995 Lunatic Taxi
1993 No Man’s land
1990 L’eau de La
1988 Explore
1988 Sixun Live
1987 Pygmées
1985 Nuit blanche
1987 Pygmées

With Joe Zawinul
2008 75th
2002 Faces and Places
1998 World tour
1996 My People

Other collaborations
2012 The Syndicate File Under Zawinul 
2003 Yakar Idrissa Diop
2002 Bendera So Kalmery
2001 Récit Proche Eddy Louiss
2001 Safi Ray Lema
2000 Poulina Orchestre National de Barbès
1997 The Blessed Rain Ashley Maher
1997 Per fortuna Purtroppo Irene Grandi
1997 Dife Kassav’
1996 Sarada Alma Rosa
1995 Emotion Papa Wemba
1991 Gaia Ray Lema
1991 Amen Salif Keita
1987 Afrijazzy Manu Dibango
1982 Fodder on My Wings Nina Simone

References 

Ivorian musicians
1956 births
Living people
People from Divo, Ivory Coast
Jazz drummers
The Zawinul Syndicate members